Alan Joel Santorini (born May 19, 1948) is a former Major League Baseball pitcher. He played all or parts of six seasons in the majors, from  until , for the Atlanta Braves, San Diego Padres and St. Louis Cardinals. In 1969, he led Padre pitchers (along with Joe Niekro) in wins, winning eight games that season.

External links

Major League Baseball pitchers
Atlanta Braves players
San Diego Padres players
St. Louis Cardinals players
Austin Braves players
Richmond Braves players
West Palm Beach Braves players
Shreveport Braves players
Salt Lake City Bees players
Eugene Emeralds players
Omaha Royals players
Toledo Mud Hens players
Tulsa Oilers (baseball) players
Baseball players from New Jersey
People from Irvington, New Jersey
Sportspeople from Essex County, New Jersey
1948 births
Living people